Anastasia Romanova primarily refers to:

 Anastasia Romanovna (1530–1560), the first wife of Ivan the Terrible
 Grand Duchess Anastasia Nikolaevna of Russia (1901–1918), daughter of Nicholas II of Russia, killed during the massacre of the Romanoff royal family by the Bolsheviks during the Communist Revolution

Anastasia with the surname Romanova or Romanovna or Romanoff may also refer to:

Grand Duchess Anastasia Mikhailovna of Russia (1860–1922), daughter of Grand Duke Michael Nikolaevich of Russia
Princess Anastasia of Montenegro, (1868–1935), wife of Grand Duke Nicholas Nikolaevich of Russia
Countess Anastasia Mikhailovna de Torby (1892–1977), morganatic daughter of Grand Duke Michael Mikhailovich of Russia
Anastasia Romanova (skier) (born 1993), Russian ski racer
Anastasia Romanova (weightlifter) (born 1991), Russian female weightlifter

See also
 Anastasia (disambiguation)
 Anastasia of Russia (disambiguation)